Tom Hugo (August 25, 1930 – November 15, 2004) was a  Canadian Football League offensive lineman and linebacker who played seven seasons for the Montreal Alouettes from 1953 to 1959. He was a Montreal All-Star 12 times (1953 offence, 1954–1958 both offence and defence, 1959 defence) during his seven seasons in the CFL. Besides being an All-Star at centre every season he played, he also intercepted 25 passes (9 alone in 1958) and returned two for touchdowns, and also returned kickoffs. September 2018. Hugo was inducted into the Canadian Football League Hall of Fame as a player in 2018.

Hugo played collegiate football for the University of Denver, where he was the center under future CFL legend Sam Etcheverry.

Notes 

1930 births
2004 deaths
American players of Canadian football
Canadian football linebackers
Canadian football offensive linemen
Montreal Alouettes players
Players of Canadian football from Honolulu
University of Denver alumni
Canadian Football Hall of Fame inductees